Michael Callaghan may refer to:

Michael Callaghan (tennis) in 1962 Australian Championships – Men's Singles
Mike Callaghan, politician
Michael Callaghan (artist) of Earthworks Poster Collective

See also
Michael Callahan (disambiguation)
Michael O'Callaghan (disambiguation)